Ihar Anatolevich Lisitsa ((Igor Lisitsa); born 10 April 1988) is a Belarusian former professional football player.

In July 2020 Lisitsa was found guilty of being involved in a match-fixing schema in Belarusian football. He was sentenced to 1 year of house arrest and banned from Belarusian football for three years.

References

External links

1988 births
Living people
Belarusian footballers
Association football midfielders
FC Lida players
FC Neman Grodno players
FC Belshina Bobruisk players
FC Granit Mikashevichi players
FC Vitebsk players
FC Naftan Novopolotsk players
People from Lida
Sportspeople from Grodno Region